Lessmann is a surname. Notable people with the surname include:

Claus Lessmann
Lara Marie Lessmann
Daniel Lessmann
Max Lessmann and Leo Lessmann, the founders of Israelitisches Familienblatt (1898-1939), a Jewish newspaper in Hamburg, Germany

See also
Lesman